Martin Van Buren National Historic Site is a unit of the United States National Park Service in Columbia County, New York,  south of the village of Kinderhook,  north of New York City  and  south of Albany. The National Historic Site preserves the Lindenwald estate owned by Martin Van Buren, the eighth president of the United States. Van Buren purchased the 36-room mansion during his presidency in 1839, and it became his home and farm from his leaving office in 1841 until his death in 1862.

History
However, Van Buren did not move into the home until 1841 (after he was defeated for his second term by the Whig candidate William Henry Harrison in 1840). Eventually, his four living sons, Abraham, John, Martin Jr., and Smith, had rooms in the mansion. The home was previously owned by the Van Ness family and was where Washington Irving wrote most of his books A History of New York and Sketch Book. Irving and Van Buren later became friends.

Van Buren ran two United States presidential campaigns from Lindenwald. In 1844, he based his ultimately unsuccessful run for the Democratic nomination at the estate. That year, Van Buren lost a hotly contested fight to nominee and eventual President James Knox Polk. In 1848, in opposition to the extension of slavery into territories captured from Mexico as a result of the Mexican–American War, Van Buren ran for president on a third-party ticket (The Free Soil Party), again directing his campaign from Lindenwald. Van Buren's campaign drew enough votes away from the Democratic nominee, Lewis Cass, to allow Whig candidate Zachary Taylor to prevail.

Van Buren named the estate Lindenwald, which is German for "linden forest", after the American Linden (American Basswood or Tilia americana) trees lining the Albany-to-New York Post Road, which is still located in front of the home. The section of the road on the property remains unimproved to this day. Some replanted Linden trees also remain by the side of the road.

Van Buren died at Lindenwald on July 24, 1862. He was 79.

Recognition
Lindenwald was declared a National Historic Landmark in 1961.

The Martin Van Buren National Historic Site was established on October 26, 1974, and today, Lindenwald is under the care of the National Park Service.

Today
A visitor center operated by the National Park Service is located at the site. Access to the Lindenwald mansion is by ranger-guided tour only. The tower cannot be visited due to fire safety codes. In addition, the grounds contain educational signs which tell of the history of the Lindenwald estate. During Van Buren's lifetime, the site also contained two gatehouses, a north one and a south one. The north gatehouse was demolished in the 1950s, but today the site is outlined with a stone foundation.

Gallery

See also
 List of residences of presidents of the United States
 Presidential memorials in the United States

Further reading
Great Houses of the Hudson River, Michael Middleton Dwyer, editor, with preface by Mark Rockefeller, Boston, Massachusetts: Little, Brown and Company, published in association with Historic Hudson Valley, 2001. .

References

External links

Martin Van Buren's "Return to the Soil", a National Park Service Teaching with Historic Places (TwHP) lesson plan

Kinderhook information
"Life Portrait of Martin Van Buren", from C-SPAN's American Presidents: Life Portraits, broadcast from the Martin Van Buren National Historic Site, May 3, 1999

National Historic Landmarks in New York (state)
Presidential homes in the United States
National Historic Sites in New York (state)
Historic house museums in New York (state)
Museums in Columbia County, New York
Presidential museums in New York (state)
Houses in Columbia County, New York
National Register of Historic Places in Columbia County, New York
Protected areas established in 1974
1974 establishments in New York (state)
Martin Van Buren
Washington Irving